Opal Tower (officially known as Opal 3, Leeds) is a 25-storey building in Leeds, West Yorkshire, England.

It serves as student accommodation for 542 students, and is close to the City campus of Leeds Beckett University and the University of Leeds.

Construction 

The initial planning application for this site (previously occupied by the Londoner pub) on Jacob St, Leeds city centre, was submitted in July 2005, for a 23-storey student apartment block. This design was later altered after initial approval and permission was granted in December 2006 to build the current 25 storey tower.

Construction work began in early 2007 with an expected completion date of September 2008. The building was designed by Morrison Design and was developed by Opal Property Group, with the site contractor being Ocon Construction. Construction was completed on time, with the development opening to its student tenants between the 15th and 20th. The development is the third tallest building in Leeds, after Bridgewater Place and The Plaza Tower which took Opal 3's title approximately a year after its completion.

Accommodation 

Opal 3 features cluster flats for up to 6 students, with single en-suite rooms being the bulk of accommodation, complemented by deluxe rooms (which have a double bed), and a small number of studio flats on the higher floors.

See also 
 List of tallest buildings and structures in Leeds
 Architecture of Leeds

External links 
 Article on Skyscraper News
 Opal 3 on the Opal Property Group Website

Buildings and structures in Leeds
Residential buildings completed in 2008
Skyscrapers in Leeds
Residential skyscrapers in England